Ricard is a pastis, an anise and licorice-flavored apéritif, created by Marseille native Paul Ricard in 1932, who marketed it as the "true pastis from Marseille". Paul Ricard's justification for the name was "I am willing to put my name on it, because I am sure of the quality of this pastis and proud of its unique taste".

History

Pre-1915: Absinthe decline

Aniseed-based liquors were popular in Southern Europe, i.e. ouzo and rakı in Mediterranean countries. Absinthe, an aniseed-based liquor largely produced by the Pernod Fils company, was the established "drink of choice" in France. However, absinthe had a high alcohol content and there were exaggerated fears that it was a dangerously addictive psychoactive drug and hallucinogen (side-effects thought to be caused by trace amounts of thujone). This prompted the French government in 1915 to enact legislation to ban all alcoholic drinks that were more than 16% alcohol, acting as a complete prohibition on aniseed-based drinks, due to their suspected of undermining the French war effort. This prohibition was part of a global trend in that year, with prohibitions on absinthe being enacted in much of Europe, including France, the Netherlands, Belgium, Switzerland, and Austria-Hungary, and even in the United States, however, recent studies demonstrate that absinthe is no more dangerous than ordinary spirits.

1915–1932: Creation of pastis 
As a result of the 1915 absinthe ban, to substitute for this traditional aperitif, Marseille locals started mixing their own aniseed-based drink, made from a combination of star anis, water, liquorice and herbs. Paul Ricard was first introduced to home-made pastis, otherwise known as "the thing" or "tiger's milk", by an old shepherd. Ricard took the recipe for this "Marseille absinthe", and started experimenting and adapting it in his laboratory to produce a more refined version. In the late 1920s, in his laboratory, Paul Ricard concocted an aniseed-based drink modelled along the same lines as this pre-existing pastis, test-marketing his product illegally in Marseilles bars, as a result incurring some fines.

1932–1940: Incorporation and production

In 1932, Paul Ricard started the Ricard company to produce and distribute the product, purportedly declaring, "It shall be called Ricard, the real pastis from Marseille!". By 1938, sales of Ricard already stood at 2.4 million litres.

1940s: Prohibition
In 1940, the production of Ricard was stopped with the Vichy regime's enactment (23 August 1940) of the "LoiContre L'Alcoolisme" ("Anti-Alcoholism Act") in France, which banned the manufacture and sale of aperitifs based upon alcohol distilled from anything other than grapes, followed by a subsequent enactment that completely banned such alcohol being advertised (September 1941). The product's illegality continued until 1944 when the production of pastis became legal again.

1950–1960: Development and expansion 
In 1951, 11 years after its interwar prohibition, once the production of pastis was authorized, the production of Ricard recommenced. In 1956, the delivery of the Ricard product on camelback, known as the "drink trailer", to avoid the fuel shortages created by the Suez Crisis, became part of the advertising of the Ricard product, such as the slogan "The Ricard Caravan vanquished thirst".

In the 1960s, Ricard opened factories all over France.

1970s: Expansion
In 1975, the companies of Ricard and Pernod Fils, the two largest French aniseed aperitif producers and fierce competitors, merged creating the Pernod Ricard group, which now produces and distributes Ricard. The product range expanded exponentially and branches were established abroad.

1984 marked the year that the billionth bottle of Ricard was sold.

Corporate entity 
Ricard is a French public company that was founded in 1932 in Marseille by Paul Ricard to sell his Ricard drink. In 1962, the Ricard business was floated on the Paris Stock Exchange.

In 1968, Ricard retired from his daily running of the Ricard company, as a result of a fit of temper with state controls (said to be due to a combination of his famous bad-temper and his detestation of the power of the French state and bureaucracy). Paul Ricard's son, Patrick Ricard, inherited Ricard as the company's single product, sold almost entirely in France. Patrick Ricard led the drink and the company's international expansion, becoming managing director in 1972.

In 1975, the companies of Ricard and Pernod Fils, the two largest French aniseed aperitif producers and fierce competitors, merged creating the Pernod Ricard group, which currently owns the Ricard company. After the merger, in 1978, Patrick Ricard became the CEO of the Pernod Ricard group which he held until his death on 17 August 2012. Today Pernod-Ricard is the second-largest drinks business in the world, with only 10% of its sales in France and one of the widest product ranges in the industry, including table wines, champagnes, scotches, cognacs, gins, and vodkas.

Currently, the Ricard firm is still based in Marseille, however, the production of Ricard today takes place in Bessan, with the blending and bottling also taking place in Bordeaux and Lille. The Ricard Company has two main functions:
 Producing the Ricard, Pacific and Lillet brands in order to commercialize them in France and export them all over the world, through the Pernod Ricard's distribution subsidiaries.
 Commercializing some products from the Pernod Ricard group in France (Clan Campbell, Chivas Regal, Jameson, Absolut, Malibu, and Perrier Jouet).

Branding 

Paul Ricard, who had a degree in fine arts, designed his drink's first poster and label. The Ricard label featured an acanthus leaf, an ornamental leaf from the south of France, which has featured on every bottle and is now recognised as a distinctive mark of the brand and of pastis in general. The Ricard brand's blue and yellow design was inspired by the sky and the sun of his native Marseille. In more recent years a bright yellow sun logo was introduced to the bottle's neck.

Production 
An anethole essence is created by rectification of anise, star anise, and fennel seeds. Various herbs and liquorice root are steeped with a neutral alcohol The anethole essence and flavored alcool are blended with sugar (less than 100 grams per litre), and caramel (giving the distinctive yellow colour). The resultant spirit is bottled and stored above 12 °C and away from sunlight, otherwise, the anethole starts to crystallise and impair its look and flavour.

Ricard is produced under the Pernod Ricard company's strategic growth plan based on sustainable development and social commitment, which is reflected in the production values of reducing water consumption for crops and production, reducing carbon emissions, and reducing wastes, therefore, the productions sites and vineyards for Ricard are usually certified in line with the United Nations' Sustainable Development Goals (ODD).

Product sales 

According to Nielsen, based on the checkouts of distributors (hypermarkets, supermarkets, drives, etc.) and the purchase declarations of Nielsen panelists, the one-litre bottle of Ricard received an annual turnover in France of 265 million euros in 2017 and 275 million euros in 2018, making it the most represented brand in distributor sales, outranking all other Pernod Ricard products sold in France, such as the six-pack (1.5-litre bottles) of Cristaline (Mineral Water) and the one-litre bottle of William Peel, which were also in the top four.

Consumption

Consumption in France 

Ricard is often considered the leading flavoured spirit in France. This century, Ricard has reported an annual consumption of their pastis in France ranging from 120 million litres to 130 million litres. The Ricard and Pastis 51 brands hold high market positions for the Pernod Ricard group, which produces and distributes them through the Ricard company. Ricard is often coined as the "first spirit brand" in France, based on the volumes sold and/or turnover.

Consumption globally 
This century, more than 40 million litres to 48.6 million litres (5.4 million 9 litre cases) of Ricard are sold globally each year, making Ricard the world's eleventh-largest spirits signature.

Serving

Traditional

In accordance with Paul Ricard's original recipe, which is the traditional way to serve Ricard, Ricard should be served cold, in a 1-to-6 dilution with chilled water, e.g. 20ml Ricard to 100ml water, after which ice cubes are added. The water is added before the ice cubes, due to the anethole's cold sensitivity This whole ritual was advocated by Paul Ricard in order to release the full aroma of the anise.  Dilution of Ricard with water causes the spirit to louch (turn milky). In its diluted form, Ricard is known colloquially as the "Milk of Marseille".

Cocktails

A number of standard cocktails exist involving Ricard, some being variants of classic cocktails involving other aniseed-based liqueurs like absinthe:

References

External links 
 Ricard Site
 Pernod Ricard Site

Food and drink companies established in 1932
Pernod Ricard brands
Anise liqueurs and spirits
Products introduced in 1932
French companies established in 1932